Estellencs is a municipality on the Spanish Balearic island of Majorca. The village of the same name is the administrative seat of the municipality. It borders the municipalities of Andratx, Calvià, Puigpunyent, and Banyalbufar.

It lies between the Serra de Tramuntana mountain range, on the slopes of Puig de Galatzó (1,026 metres), and the Mediterranean Sea.

References

External links
Estellencs on Mallorcafacts.com
Municipality of Estellencs
English destination guide for Estellencs

Municipalities in Mallorca
Populated places in Mallorca